Harcourt Burland Bull (June 2, 1824 – August 12, 1881) was an Ontario journalist and political figure. He was a Conservative member of the Senate of Canada from 1879 to 1881.

He was born in Dublin, Ireland in 1824, the son of George Perkins Bull. He operated the Hamilton Gazette, a newspaper founded by his father, from 1847 until it was taken over by the Hamilton Spectator during the 1850s. Bull was elected to the Legislative Council of the Province of Canada for Burlington division in 1864 and served until Confederation. He was named to the Senate in 1879.

External links 
 

1824 births
1881 deaths
Members of the Legislative Council of the Province of Canada
Canadian senators from Ontario
Conservative Party of Canada (1867–1942) senators
Irish emigrants to pre-Confederation Ontario